Degli Esposti is a surname. Notable people with the surname include:

Federico Degli Esposti (born 1980), Italian figure skater
Piera Degli Esposti (1938–2021), Italian actress
 

Compound surnames